Gephyromantis salegy, commonly known as the Abolokopatrika Madagascar frog, is a species of frog in the family Mantellidae.  It is endemic to Madagascar.  Its natural habitats are subtropical or tropical moist lowland forests and subtropical or tropical moist montane forests.  It is threatened by habitat loss.

References

salegy
Endemic fauna of Madagascar
Taxonomy articles created by Polbot
Amphibians described in 2003